The Fear of Love (Italian: La paura di amare) is a 1920 Italian silent film directed by Roberto Roberti and starring Gustavo Serena.

Cast
 Alberto Albertini 
 Gustavo Serena
 Guido Trento 
 Vera Vergani

References

Bibliography
 Aldo Bernardini & Vittorio Martinelli. Il cinema muto italiano: I film del dopoguerra, 1920. Nuova ERI, 1995.

External links

1920 films
1920s Italian-language films
Films directed by Roberto Roberti
Italian silent feature films
Italian black-and-white films